This is a list of members of the European Parliament for the Luxembourg in the 2014 to 2019 session.

See 2014 European Parliament election in Luxembourg for further information on these elections in Luxembourg.

List 
This table can be sorted by party or party group: click the symbol at the top of the appropriate column.

References

2014
List
Luxembourg